Meril-Prothom Alo Critics Choice Award for Best Film Director is an award presented annually by Meril-Prothom Alo as part of its Meril-Prothom Alo Awards.

Multiple wins and nominations
The following individuals have won multiple Best Film Director awards:

The following directors have received multiple Best Film Director nominations (* indicates no wins):

Winners and nominees

2000s

2010s

See also
 Meril-Prothom Alo Awards

References

External links

Directing
Awards for best director
Best Film Directing Meril-Prothom Alo Critics Choice Award winners